The Nationality, Immigration and Asylum Act 2002 (c. 41) is an Act of the Parliament of the United Kingdom. It received royal assent on 7 November 2002.

This Act created a number of changes to the law including:

British Nationals with no other citizenship 

The Nationality, Immigration and Asylum Act 2002 has also granted British Overseas Citizens, British Subjects and British Protected Persons the right to register as British citizens if they have no other citizenship or nationality and have not after 4 July 2002 renounced, voluntarily relinquished or lost through action or inaction any citizenship or nationality. Previously such persons would have not had the right of abode in any country, and would have thus been de facto stateless.

Overseas born children of British mothers 

The Act has also conferred a right to registration as a British citizen on persons born between 8 February 1961 and 31 December 1982 who, but for the inability (at that time) of women to pass on their citizenship, would have acquired British citizenship automatically when the British Nationality Act 1981 came into force.

In adding a section 4C to the British Nationality Act 1981, a person is entitled to registration if:

the person was born after 7 February 1961 but before 1 January 1983;
the person was born to a mother who was a citizen of the United Kingdom and Colonies at the time and the person would have been a citizen of the United Kingdom and Colonies by descent if it had been possible for women to pass on citizenship of the United Kingdom and Colonies to their children in the same way as men could; and
had the person been a citizen of the United Kingdom and Colonies, they would have had the right of abode in the United Kingdom under the Immigration Act 1971 and would have become a British citizen on 1 January 1983.

Registration under both these categories confers British citizenship by descent and hence those with permanent residence in the United Kingdom, or those with the right to take up permanent residence in the United Kingdom, may prefer to apply for naturalisation or section 4 registration instead.  Both of these registration categories give British citizenship otherwise than by descent.

Deprivation of British nationality 
Under amendments made by the Act, British nationals can be deprived of their citizenship if the Secretary of State is satisfied they are responsible for acts seriously prejudicial to the vital interests of the United Kingdom or an Overseas Territory. This provision applied to only dual nationals-—it is not applicable if deprivation would result in a person's statelessness.

Prior to this law, British nationals who acquired that status by birth or descent (as opposed to registration or naturalisation) could not be deprived of British nationality.

Citizenship ceremonies 

All new applicants for British citizenship from 1 January 2004 who are aged 18 or over must attend a citizenship ceremony and take an Oath of Allegiance and a Pledge to the United Kingdom before their grant of British citizenship can take effect

 the requirement for a citizenship ceremony applies to applicants for registration as well as naturalisation
 prior to 1 January 2004, British overseas territories citizens, British Overseas citizens, British subjects and British Nationals (Overseas), as well of citizens of countries sharing the Queen as Head of State (such as Australia and Canada) were exempt from taking the oath of allegiance.  This exemption was abolished.

Similar requirements are imposed on applicants for British overseas territories citizenship, with the exception that the Pledge is based on the relevant territory rather than the United Kingdom.

It is unusual for adults to acquire British Overseas citizenship or British subject status (application must be made before age 18 and is very rarely granted); however, in such a case only an Oath of Allegiance would be required.

English language requirements 

From 28 July 2004, English (or Welsh or Scottish Gaelic) language requirements for naturalisation applicants were increased:

 the language competency requirement was extended to those applying for naturalisation as the spouse of a British citizen
 evidentiary requirements were increased.

Life in the United Kingdom test 

From 1 November 2005, all new applicants for naturalisation as a British citizen must (unless exempted) prove they have passed the Life in the United Kingdom test.

 The test must be passed before application is made to the Home Office
 Those who pass the test do not need to provide separate evidence of language competency
 Those aged 65 or over may be able to claim exemption
 Those who attend combined citizenship and English (or Welsh) classes may be exempted from the test

Neither the language nor Life in the UK test requirements apply to those seeking registration (as opposed to naturalisation) as a British citizen.

Note that passing the test is also required for anyone wishing to remain indefinitely in the UK, whether or not they apply for citizenship. E.g., a husband or wife of a British citizen will be deported if they do not pass the test in time.

Children of unmarried British fathers 
With effect from 1 July 2006, children may acquire British citizenship automatically from an unmarried British father (or a British permanent resident if the child is born in the United Kingdom).   Proof of paternity must be shown.

Children born to unmarried British fathers before 1 July 2006 are not included in this provision.  However they can be registered as British citizens upon application to the Home Office (if not British some other way), provided the child is aged under 18 and would have been British had the father been married to the mother. However, the agreement of the mother is needed. If the mother refuses then policy is for the home office to enquire of her reasons for refusal. If her reasons are deemed unreasonable registration may still be granted. Also, the minor can apply in his own right on reaching the age of 17.

(As of 6 April 2015, a person over 18 years of age who was born out of wedlock before 1 July 2006 to a British father is entitled to register as a British citizen by descent under the Immigration Act 2014 using form UKF. Such child must also meet character requirements, pay relevant processing fees and attend a citizenship ceremony. However, if the applicant has a claim to register as a British citizen under other clauses of the British Nationality Act 1981, or has already acquired British citizenship after being legitimised, the application will be refused.)

External links

References

United Kingdom Acts of Parliament 2002
Immigration law in the United Kingdom
British nationality law
Right of asylum legislation in the United Kingdom
Immigration legislation